Dinos Constantinides  (10 May 1929 – 20 July 2021) was a Greek-American composer of contemporary classical music.

Constantinides was born in Ioannina, Greece. He studied violin and music theory at the Greek Conservatory in Athens, then violin at the Juilliard School in New York. He received a master's degree in music from Indiana University and a doctoral degree in composition from Michigan State University. He played violin in the State Orchestra in Athens for 10 years. Since 1967 Constantinides has taught at Louisiana State University, and received a Boyd Professorship of Composition there in 1986. He also directed the University's New Music Festival and the Louisiana Sinfonietta. He has received first prizes in the 1981 Brooklyn College International Chamber Competition, the 1985 First Midwest Chamber Opera Conference, and the 1997 Delius composition Contest Grand Prize. He died at the age of 92 on 20 July 2021.

References 

1929 births
2021 deaths
People from Ioannina
20th-century classical composers
21st-century classical composers
Greek classical composers
American classical composers
Male classical composers
20th-century American male musicians
21st-century American male musicians
Greek emigrants to the United States
Juilliard School alumni
Indiana University alumni
Michigan State University alumni
Centaur Records artists